The 2018 Gardner–Webb Runnin' Bulldogs football team represented Gardner–Webb University in the 2018 NCAA Division I FCS football season. They were led by sixth-year head coach Carroll McCray and played their home games at Ernest W. Spangler Stadium. They were a member of the Big South Conference. They finished the season 3–8, 2–3 in Big South play to finish in fourth place.

Previous season
The Runnin' Bulldogs finished the 2017 season 1–10, 0–5 in Big South play to finish in last place.

Preseason

Big South poll
In the Big South preseason poll released on July 23, 2018, the Runnin' Bulldogs were predicted to finish in fourth place.

Preseason All-Big South team
The Big South released their preseason all-Big South team on July 23, 2018, with the Runnin' Bulldogs having two players on the honorable mention list.

Honorable mention

Will Millikan – OL

Josh Ramseur – DL

Schedule

Source:

Game summaries

Limestone

at North Carolina A&T

Western Carolina

at Appalachian State

Wofford

at East Tennessee State

Kennesaw State

at Campbell

Presbyterian

at Charleston Southern

Monmouth

References

Gardner-Webb
Gardner–Webb Runnin' Bulldogs football seasons
Gardner-Webb Runnin' Bulldogs f